Christ Episcopal Church and Cemetery is a historic Episcopal church on Louisiana Highway 1 between Courthouse Street and Louisiana Highway 1008 in Napoleonville, Louisiana.  It was designed by New York City architect Frank Wills in a Gothic Revival style as if it were an English village church, but with adaptations for Louisiana materials.  It was built in 1853 and was added to the National Register of Historic Places in 1977.

It is located on the west bank of Bayou Lafourche on land donated by Dr. E. E. Kittredge for the church, on the corner of the former Elm Hall Plantation.

See also
 National Register of Historic Places listings in Assumption Parish, Louisiana

References

External links
 

Episcopal church buildings in Louisiana
Churches on the National Register of Historic Places in Louisiana
Gothic Revival church buildings in Louisiana
Churches completed in 1853
Anglican cemeteries in the United States
Churches in Assumption Parish, Louisiana
Cemeteries on the National Register of Historic Places in Louisiana
19th-century Episcopal church buildings
National Register of Historic Places in Assumption Parish, Louisiana
Buildings and structures in Napoleonville, Louisiana